The 43rd Academy Awards ceremony, presented by Academy of Motion Picture Arts and Sciences, was held on April 15, 1971, and took place at the Dorothy Chandler Pavilion to honor the best films of 1970. The Awards, without a host for the third consecutive year, were broadcast by NBC for the first time in 11 years.

George C. Scott, winner of Best Actor for Patton, became the first actor to refuse an Oscar, having previously protested his nomination for Best Supporting Actor for The Hustler (1961) and quoted as saying that the Academy Awards were "a two-hour meat parade, a public display with contrived suspense for economic reasons."

With her Best Supporting Actress win for Airport, Helen Hayes became the first performer to win Oscars in both lead and supporting categories (having won Best Actress 38 years before for The Sin of Madelon Claudet). Her win set a record for the biggest gap between acting wins, subsequently broken by Katharine Hepburn (48 years between her first and last wins).

The documentary film Woodstock garnered three Oscar nominations, making it the most nominated documentary film in Oscar history (its record was later tied by Flee, 51 years later).

This was the only time since the 6th Academy Awards that all five nominees for Best Actress were first-time nominees, and was the last time that either lead acting category was entirely composed of new nominees until the 95th Academy Awards. It was also the first time since the 7th Academy Awards in which none of the nominees for the Best Actor had a previous nomination in that category.

Winners and nominees

Nominees were announced on February 23, 1971. Winners are listed first, highlighted in boldface and indicated with a double dagger.

Films with multiple wins and nominations

Academy Honorary Award
 Lillian Gish
 Orson Welles

Irving G. Thalberg Memorial Award
 Ingmar Bergman

Jean Hersholt Humanitarian Award
 Frank Sinatra

Presenters and performers
The following individuals presented awards or performed musical numbers.

Presenters

Performers

See also
 28th Golden Globe Awards
 1970 in film
 13th Grammy Awards
 22nd Primetime Emmy Awards
 23rd Primetime Emmy Awards
 24th British Academy Film Awards
 25th Tony Awards

References

Academy Awards ceremonies
1970 film awards
1971 in Los Angeles
1971 in American cinema
April 1971 events in the United States